An applicant tracking system (ATS) is a software application that enables the electronic handling of recruitment and hiring needs. An ATS can be implemented or accessed online at enterprise- or small-business levels, depending on the needs of the organization; free and open-source ATS software is also available. An ATS is very similar to customer relationship management (CRM) systems, but are designed for recruitment tracking purposes. In many cases they filter applications automatically based on given criteria such as keywords, skills, former employers, years of experience and schools attended. This has caused many to adapt resume optimization techniques similar to those used in search engine optimization when creating and formatting their résumé.

Principle
A dedicated ATS is not uncommon for recruitment-specific needs. On the enterprise level it may be offered as a module or functional addition to a human resources suite or human resource information system (HRIS). The ATS is expanding into small and medium enterprises through open-source or software as a service offerings (SaaS).

The principal function of an ATS is to provide a central location and database for a company's recruitment efforts. ATSs are built to better assist management of resumes and applicant information. Data is either collected from internal applications via the ATS front-end, located on the company website or is extracted from applicants on job boards. Most job and resume boards (Reed Online, LinkedIn.com, Monster.com, Hotjobs, CareerBuilder, Indeed.com) have partnerships with ATS software providers to provide parsing support and easy data migration from one system to another. Newer applicant tracking systems (often the epithet is next-generation) are platforms as a service, where the main piece of software has integration points that allow providers of other recruiting technology to plug in seamlessly. The ability of these next-generation ATS solutions allows jobs to be posted where the candidate is and not just on-job boards. This ability is being referred to as omnichannel talent acquisition.

Recent changes include use of artificial intelligence (AI) tools and natural language processing to facilitate guided semantic search capabilities offered through cloud-based platforms that allow companies to score and sort resumes with better alignment to the job requirements and descriptions.
With the advent of ATS, resume optimization techniques and online tools are often used by applicants to increase their chances of landing an interview call.

References

Business software
Human resource management
E-recruitment